The Edgefiled Branch Railroad was a South Carolina railroad that existed immediately after the Reconstruction Era of the United States.

Charter
The Edgefield Branch Railroad was chartered in 1878 to build a line from Edgefield Court House, South Carolina, to extend to Trenton, South Carolina, where it would be able to connect with the Charlotte, Columbia and Augusta Railroad.

Name change
A year later, the company's charter was amended in 1879 to change the line's name to the Edgefield, Trenton and Aiken Railroad.

See also
 Atlantic and French Broad Valley Railroad
 Belton, Williamston and Easley Railroad
 Carolina and Cumberland Gap Railway
 Carolina, Cumberland Gap and Chicago Railway
 Edgefield, Trenton and Aiken Railroad
 French Broad and Atlantic Railway

References

Defunct South Carolina railroads
Railway companies established in 1878
Railway companies disestablished in 1879
American companies disestablished in 1879
American companies established in 1878